The 2011–12 season, Sunderland competed in the Premier League. They finished the season in 13th place, ending with a total of 45 points.

Results

Pre-season

Premier League

Managerial change

After winning just 2 of their first 13 Premier League games and following the defeat by Wigan Athletic, chairman Ellis Short moved to sack Steve Bruce on 30 November. Assistant manager Eric Black assumed first team responsibilities until a new manager could be found. Martin O'Neill was appointed manager on 3 December with a three-year contract.

Table

League Cup

FA Cup

Statistics

Appearances and goals

|-
|colspan="14"|Players that played for Sunderland this season that have left the club or went out on loan:

|}

Goal scorers

Overall

Updated 13 May 2012

Squad
Squad at end of season

Transfers

In

Total spending:  £28,350,000

Out

Total income:  £25,000,000

Awards

Monthly awards

End of Season Awards

See also
Sunderland A.F.C. seasons

References

External links
2011–12 Sunderland season at ESPN

Sunderland A.F.C. seasons
Sunderland